Ilanlu may refer to:
 Ilanlu, Azerbaijan
 Ilanlu, Hamadan, Iran
 Ilanlu, West Azerbaijan, Iran